This is a list of seasons played by VfL Wolfsburg Frauen, VfL Wolfsburg's women's section, in German and European football, from the foundation of the first German championship, one year after the creation of the original incarnation of the team, Eintracht Wolfsburg, to the latest completed season. Eintracht was absorbed by VfL Wolfsburg in 2003.

Summary
Top scorers in bold were also the top scorers in the Frauen-Bundesliga that season.

References

women's seasons
Wolfsburg Women
Wolfsburg